Myrcia pendula is a species of plant in the family Myrtaceae. It is endemic to rainforest habitats in south-east Bahia, Brazil, at 600 to 700 metres above sea level. The tree was first described in 2010 and grows to between 3 and 15 metres tall.

References

pendula
Crops originating from the Americas
Crops originating from Brazil
Tropical fruit
Flora of South America
Endemic flora of Brazil
Fruits originating in South America
Fruit trees
Berries
Plants described in 2010